The Reduction Agents are a New Zealand band fronted by James Milne, who also records under the name Lawrence Arabia. In 2006 the band released their debut album The Dance Reduction Agents. In the same year, Milne released his debut solo album, Lawrence Arabia. Both albums were nominated for several bNet awards, New Zealand's public voted alternative radio awards.

Milne has been involved in the internationally successful pop group The Brunettes and toured as bass player for American band Okkervil River. He has also produced music for film and theater, and two Reduction Agents songs appear in the soundtrack to the film Eagle vs Shark.

Solo discography

External links
The Reduction Agents' MySpace page
Lil' Chief Records

New Zealand indie pop groups
Lil' Chief Records artists